This is a glossary featuring terms used across different areas in mathematics, or terms that do not typically appear in more specialized glossaries. For the terms used only in some specific areas of mathematics, see glossaries in :Category:Glossaries of mathematics.

B

C

D

F

I

M

P

S

See also 
Glossary of areas of mathematics
List of mathematical constants
List of mathematical jargon
List of mathematical symbols
:Category:Mathematical terminology

References 
Encyclopedia of Mathematics

 
Wikipedia glossaries using description lists